James George Stopford, 3rd Earl of Courtown KP, PC (15 August 1765 – 15 June 1835), known as Viscount Stopford from 1770 to 1810, was an Anglo-Irish peer and Tory politician.

Courtown was the eldest son of James Stopford, 2nd Earl of Courtown, and his wife Mary (née Powys). Educated at Eton College, he served with the Coldstream Guards and achieved the rank of captain.

In 1790, he was elected to the House of Commons for Great Bedwyn, a seat he held until 1796 and again from 1806 to 1807. He also represented Lanark from 1796 to 1802, Dumfries from 1803 to 1806 and Marlborough from 1807 to 1810. In 1793, he succeeded his father as Treasurer of the Household in the government of William Pitt the Younger, a post he held until 1806 (from 1801 to 1804 under the Premiership of Henry Addington), and again from 1807 to 1812 under the Duke of Portland and Spencer Perceval.

Courtown succeeded his father in the earldom 1810 and held office in the House of Lords as Captain of the Honourable Band of Gentlemen Pensioners under the Earl of Liverpool between 1812 and 1827 and as Captain of the Yeomen of the Guard under Sir Robert Peel in 1835. He was admitted to the Privy Council in 1793 and made a Knight of the Order of St Patrick in 1821.

Lord Courtown married Lady Mary, daughter of Henry Scott, 3rd Duke of Buccleuch and Lady Elizabeth Montagu, in 1791. They had five sons and one daughter. The two eldest sons died as infants. Their fifth and youngest son the Hon. Sir Montagu Stopford (1798–1864) was a Vice-Admiral in the Royal Navy and the grandfather of General Sir Montagu George North Stopford. Lady Courtown died in April 1823, aged 53. Lord Courtown survived her by twelve years and died in June 1835, aged 69. He was succeeded in the earldom by his third but eldest surviving son James.

References

Kidd, Charles, Williamson, David (editors). Debrett's Peerage and Baronetage (1990 edition). New York: St Martin's Press, 1990,

External links 
 

1765 births
1835 deaths
People educated at Eton College
Coldstream Guards officers
Knights of St Patrick
Members of the Parliament of Great Britain for English constituencies
Members of the Parliament of Great Britain for Scottish constituencies
British MPs 1790–1796
British MPs 1796–1800
Members of the Parliament of the United Kingdom for Scottish constituencies
Members of the Parliament of the United Kingdom for English constituencies
UK MPs 1801–1802
UK MPs 1802–1806
UK MPs 1806–1807
UK MPs 1807–1812
UK MPs who inherited peerages
Treasurers of the Household
Honourable Corps of Gentlemen at Arms
Members of the Privy Council of Great Britain
James
Earls of Courtown
Members of Parliament for Great Bedwyn
Members of Parliament for Marlborough